Ruinaulta is a canyon created by the Anterior Rhine by Ilanz/Glion and Reichenau in the debris of the Flims Rockslide just upstream of its confluence with the Posterior Rhine at Reichenau in the Grisons, eastern Switzerland. It is sometimes known as the Rhine Gorge, or sometimes rather ironically called the Swiss Grand Canyon. Protected by cliffs several hundred metres high, the area is forested and a haven for wildlife. It is a popular location for rafting.

The gorge is largely inaccessible by road, but is traversed by the Disentis to Chur line of the Rhaetian Railway. It is accessible from the Valendas-Sagogn, Versam-Safien and Trin stations that lie within the gorge.

References

External links 
 Photo Gallery of the Rhine canyon by Tim Dellmann

Canyons and gorges of Switzerland
Landforms of Graubünden
Tourist attractions in Graubünden
Ilanz/Glion
Tamins